Andrew Frederick Herrick (born 1958) is a retired Anglican priest who served as Archdeacon of Anglesey.

Herrick was born in Lincolnshire and educated at the University of Wales and Wycliffe Hall Oxford. He was ordained deacon in 1982, and priest in 1983. After a curacy in Aberystwyth he was Priest in charge at Llangeitho. He held incumbencies at Aberporth, Ammanford, Aberystwyth, Lampeter and Holyhead
. He was collated archdeacon on 6 May 2018 and retired effective 24 July 2022.

References

1958 births
Living people
Alumni of the University of Wales
21st-century Welsh Anglican priests
20th-century Welsh Anglican priests
Alumni of Wycliffe Hall, Oxford
Archdeacons of Anglesey
People from Lincolnshire